The  is a museum on the subject of gold mining in ancient and modern Japan, which is located next to the Toi gold mine in the city of Izu, Shizuoka, Japan.

The museum displays reconstitutions of the manufacturing process for gold during the Tokugawa period, ancient artifacts from the period, explanatory exhibitions about gold processing, and an exhibit of various gold ores from various places throughout Japan.

The museum received some fame for housing the world's largest gold bar, weighing , and representing a 2016 value of about 1.1 billion yen (US$9.7 million). The bar obtained an official Guinness record certificate for "The largest manufactured pure gold bar":

References

External links
 Official website 

Museums in Shizuoka Prefecture
Mining museums in Japan
Gold museums
Izu, Shizuoka